Kristina Tučkutė (born October 18, 1983) is a Lithuanian fashion model who launched her career in 1995 and has since appeared on magazine covers and campaigns throughout the world and has been featured by design houses including Giorgio Armani, Gianfranco Ferre, Roberto Cavalli, Blumarine, Wolford, La Perla, Triumph, Parah, and many more.

Early life

Born in Klaipeda, Lithuania, a town that is close to the Baltic Sea, Tučkutė was raised in Lithuania along with her sister Zita. Their mother Ala is a Russian native who worked in Lithuania as a frontier police officer during the girls’ youth while their Lithuanian father Romas served as a frontier commissioner.

As a young girl in Lithuania, Tučkute enjoyed riding horses and playing tennis and became an excellent marksman at the police facility’s shooting range. While she dreamt of an athletic career, a modeling class taken to improve her postured changed everything, and her athletic distinction later translated into her raw power in the modeling world.

Career

While taking a modeling class in Lithuania, a top national agency noticed Tučkute, launching her modeling career in 1995. Tučkute was soon signed to the Metropolitan Agency by Michel Levaton in Paris.

Within one year of launching her modeling career, Tučkute was invited by Guido Dolci, the president of Major Model agency, to relocate to Milan, Italy, the world’s showcase of Italian fashion and beauty.

With a facility for languages as well as modeling, Tučkute quickly learned Italian and found Milan to be her home away from home, as well as the site of her career’s ascent.

In 2000, Tučkute began regularly appearing in top fashion magazines across the globe and modeling collections for a variety of leading design houses. In less than one year, she appeared on dozens of magazine covers across the world.
 
Tučkute with friends Hotel Relais et Chateaux Stikliai owners Alexandr and Ana Ciulpij during the 200 year Laurent-Perrier champagne anniversary event.

Tučkute signed a three-year contract with Levante, a company well known for its exquisite stockings and lingerie and beauty and hosiery campaigns. She appears in both television and print pieces and has also starred in several TV commercials (for Levante, Geox and AZ) to further her interest in acting.

In addition, Tučkute is also launching her line of cosmetics called Shhh... it's secret by Kristina Tučkute.

Personal

Tučkute remains close with her parents and sister as well as the modeling family she has developed in Italy. Her dreams are to have a family of her own and to “continue to bring joy and happiness to others. Right now, I feel like they will all come true.”

References

External links

www.kristinatuckute.com — Company website
www.facebook.com/kristinatuckute — Facebook

1983 births
Living people
Lithuanian female models